The Colegio Alemán de Guadalajara A.C. is a German international school in Zapopan, Jalisco, in Greater Guadalajara. The school serves kindergarten through bachillerato (high school). It was founded in 1979. The school offers the IB Diploma Programme for their students.

See also

 German immigration to Mexico

References

External links
 Colegio Alemán de Guadalajara 

German international schools in Mexico
International schools in the Guadalajara Metropolitan Area
High schools in Mexico
1979 establishments in Mexico
Educational institutions established in 1979
Zapopan